Ary "Pavão" dos Santos Furtado, also commonly known as Pavão (born 6 September 1917), was a Brazilian basketball player. He competed in the men's tournament at the 1936 Summer Olympics.

References

External links
 

1917 births
Possibly living people
Brazilian men's basketball players
Olympic basketball players of Brazil
Basketball players at the 1936 Summer Olympics